William Dunlap Simpson (October 27, 1823December 26, 1890) was the 78th governor of South Carolina from February 26, 1879, when the previous governor, Wade Hampton, resigned to take his seat in the U.S. Senate, until 1880. That year Simpson resigned to become Chief Justice of the South Carolina Supreme Court.

Born in Laurens District, South Carolina, in 1823, he was educated at South Carolina College (later the University of South Carolina), completing his studies in 1843, and spent one term at Harvard Law School. He practiced law in Laurens with his partner (and father-in-law) Henry Clinton Young. As of 1860, Simpson enslaved 31 people at his properties in Laurens. He served in the South Carolina legislature in the 1850s and early 1860s, and in the Confederate States House of Representatives from 1863 to 1865.

After the Civil War, Simpson returned to practice law in Laurens until 1876, when he ran successfully for the post of lieutenant governor. That year Democrats regained control of the state legislature and the governorship. He was re-elected in 1878. Upon Wade Hampton resigning from the governorship to assume his US Senate seat (to which he was elected by the state legislature), Simpson was elevated to become the 78th governor of South Carolina.

In 1880 he resigned after being appointed Chief Justice of the state Supreme Court. He served for ten years from 1880 until his death in 1890. He is buried at the Laurens City Cemetery.

Legacy and honors
The William Dunlap Simpson House was added to the National Register of Historic Places in 1974.

References

External links
 SCIway Biography of William Dunlap Simpson
 NGA Biography of William Dunlap Simpson
 Simpson's papers at the University of North Carolina
Pictures of William Dunlap Simpson home Laurens, S.C.

1823 births
1890 deaths
Harvard Law School alumni
University of South Carolina alumni
Members of the Confederate House of Representatives from South Carolina
19th-century American politicians
Democratic Party governors of South Carolina
University of South Carolina trustees
Chief Justices of the South Carolina Supreme Court
People from Laurens, South Carolina
19th-century American judges